The Angara is a river in south-east Siberia, Russia.

Angara may also refer to:

Places

India 
 Angara, Andhra Pradesh, a village
 Angara block, an administrative unit in Jharkhand
 Angara, Jharkhand, a village in Ranchi district

Russia/Siberia 
 Angara craton, also known as Siberia, a historical continent
 Angara Range, a mountain range in Siberia

Ukraine 
 Perevalne or Angara, a village in Simferopol Raion, Crimea

Arts and entertainment 
 Angara (film), Pakistani action film
 Angara, a fictional continent in Golden Sun
 The angara, a fictional alien species in Mass Effect: Andromeda
 Angara (Tulsi Comics), a fictional character from Tulsi Comics

Other uses 
Angara (icebreaker), a museum ship in Irkutsk, Russia
 Angara (rocket family), a Russian space-launch vehicle
 Angara Airlines, a Russian airline
 Angara (surname), including a list of people with the name
 Angara language, a language of South America

See also
 Lena-Angara Plateau in Siberia
 Upper Angara, a river in Siberia
 Upper Angara Range, a mountain range in Siberia
 Angora (disambiguation)
 Angaria (disambiguation)
 Angarsky (disambiguation)
 Ankara (disambiguation)